Ritchie Blackmore may refer to:

Ritchie Blackmore, an English guitarist and songwriter. Also part of Rainbow and of the music duo Blackmore's Night
Ritchie Blackmore's Rainbow, first album by British rock guitarist Ritchie Blackmore's solo band Rainbow
Ritchie Blackmore Stratocaster, an alternative known name for the electric guitar Fender Stratocaster

See also
Richie Blackmore (rugby league), New Zealand rugby league player and coach